Plunging fire is a form of indirect fire, where gunfire is fired at a trajectory to make it fall on its target from above. It is normal at the high trajectories used to attain long range, and can be used deliberately to attack a target not susceptible to direct or grazing fire due to not being in direct line of sight.

In naval warfare, plunging shellfire was theoretically capable of penetrating an enemy ship's thinner deck armor rather than firing directly at a warship's heavily armored side.

Plunging fire in terrestrial warfare allows attacking a target not in direct line of sight, for example over the brow of a hill engaging in a reverse slope defence. Artillery weapons such as howitzers and mortars are designed for this purpose. Machine guns and belt-fed grenade launchers may also use plunging fire.

A top attack weapon is designed to attack armoured vehicles from above as a form of plunging fire, as the armour is usually thinnest on the top of the vehicle. Ideally, it will penetrate perpendicular to the attacked surface.  The device may be delivered (often as a submunition) by an anti-tank guided missile, mortar, artillery shell, or even an emplaced munition such as a mine. Top attack munitions use either a high-explosive anti-tank (HEAT) warhead for direct impact or near impact, or an explosively formed penetrator (EFP) warhead fired while flying over the target (overfly top attack, OTA).

The top attack concept was first put into service by the Swedish Armed Forces in 1988 with the Bofors RBS 56 BILL top-attack anti-tank missile.

Weapon systems using top attack 

Notable weapon systems that utilize top attack include:

See also 

 Ballistic coefficient
 Grazing fire

References 

Artillery operation
Weapon operation